Paraffin wax (or petroleum wax) is a soft colorless solid derived from petroleum, coal, or oil shale that consists of a mixture of hydrocarbon molecules containing between 20 and 40 carbon atoms. Common applications for paraffin wax include lubrication, electrical insulation, and candles; dyed paraffin wax can be made into crayons. It is distinct from kerosene and other petroleum products that are sometimes called paraffin.

Un-dyed, unscented paraffin candles are odorless and bluish-white. Paraffin wax was first created by Carl Reichenbach in Germany in 1830 and marked a major advancement in candlemaking technology, as it burned more cleanly and reliably than tallow candles and was cheaper to produce.

In chemistry, paraffin is used synonymously with alkane, indicating hydrocarbons with the general formula CnH2n+2. The name is derived from Latin parum ("very little") + affinis, meaning "lacking affinity" or "lacking reactivity", referring to paraffin's unreactive nature.

Properties 
It is insoluble in water, but soluble in ether, benzene, and certain esters. Paraffin is unaffected by most common chemical reagents but burns readily. Its heat of combustion is 42 MJ/kg.

Paraffin wax is an excellent electrical insulator, with a resistivity of between 1013 and 1017 ohm metre. This is better than nearly all other materials except some plastics (notably Teflon). It is an effective neutron moderator and was used in James Chadwick's 1932 experiments to identify the neutron.

Paraffin wax is an excellent material for storing heat, with a specific heat capacity of 2.14–2.9 J g−1 K−1 (joules per gram kelvin) and a heat of fusion of 200–220 J g−1. Paraffin wax phase-change cooling coupled with retractable radiators was used to cool the electronics of the Lunar Roving Vehicle during the crewed missions to the Moon in the early 1970s. Wax expands considerably when it melts and this allows its use in wax element thermostats for industrial, domestic and, particularly, automobile purposes.

History 
Paraffin wax was first created in 1830 by German chemist Karl von Reichenbach when he attempted to develop a method to efficiently separate and refine waxy substances naturally occurring in petroleum. Paraffin represented a major advance in the candlemaking industry, because it burned cleanly and was cheaper to manufacture than other candle fuels. Paraffin wax initially suffered from a low melting point. This was remedied by adding stearic acid. The production of paraffin wax enjoyed a boom in the early 20th century due to the growth of the oil and meatpacking industries, which created paraffin and stearic acid as byproducts.

Manufacturing 
The feedstock for paraffin is slack wax, which is a mixture of oil and wax, a byproduct from the refining of lubricating oil.

The first step in making paraffin wax is to remove the oil (de-oiling or de-waxing) from the slack wax. The oil is separated by crystallization. Most commonly, the slack wax is heated, mixed with one or more solvents such as a ketone and then cooled. As it cools, wax crystallizes out of the solution, leaving only oil. This mixture is filtered into two streams: solid (wax plus some solvent) and liquid (oil and solvent). After the solvent is recovered by distillation, the resulting products are called "product wax" (or "press wax") and "foots oil". The lower the percentage of oil in the wax, the more refined it is considered (semi-refined versus fully refined). The product wax may be further processed to remove colors and odors. The wax may finally be blended together to give certain desired properties such as melt point and penetration. Paraffin wax is sold in either liquid or solid form.

Applications 
In industrial applications, it is often useful to modify the crystal properties of the paraffin wax, typically by adding branching to the existing carbon backbone chain. The modification is usually done with additives, such as EVA copolymers, microcrystalline wax, or forms of polyethylene. The branched properties result in a modified paraffin with a higher viscosity, smaller crystalline structure, and modified functional properties. Pure paraffin wax is rarely used for carving original models for casting metal and other materials in the lost wax process, as it is relatively brittle at room temperature and presents the risks of chipping and breakage when worked. Soft and pliable waxes, like beeswax, may be preferred for such sculpture, but "investment casting waxes," often paraffin-based, are expressly formulated for the purpose.

In a histology or pathology laboratory, paraffin wax is used to impregnate tissue prior to sectioning thin samples. Water is removed from the tissue through ascending strengths of alcohol (75% to absolute), and the tissue is cleared in an organic solvent such as xylene. The tissue is then placed in paraffin wax for several hours, then set in a mold with wax to cool and solidify. Sections are then cut on a microtome.

Other uses 
 Candle-making
 Wax carving
 Bicycle chain lubrication
 Coatings for waxed paper or waxed cotton
 Food-grade paraffin wax:
 Shiny coating used in candy-making; although edible, it is nondigestible, passing through the body without being broken down
 Coating for many kinds of hard cheese, like Edam cheese
 Sealant for jars, cans, and bottles
 Chewing gum additive
 Investment casting
 Anti-caking agent, moisture repellent, and dustbinding coatings for fertilizers
 Agent for preparation of specimens for histology
 Bullet lubricant – with other ingredients, such as olive oil and beeswax
 Phlegmatizing agent, commonly used to stabilise/desensitize high explosives such as RDX
 Crayons
 Solid propellant for hybrid rocket motors
 Component of surfboard wax, ski wax, and skateboard wax
 Ink. Used as the basis for solid ink different color blocks of wax for thermal printers. The wax is melted and then sprayed on the paper producing images with a shiny surface
 Microwax: food additive, a glazing agent with E number E905
 Forensic investigations: the nitrate test uses paraffin wax to detect nitrates and nitrites on the hand of a shooting suspect
 Antiozonant agents: blends of paraffin and micro waxes are used in rubber compounds to prevent cracking of the rubber; the admixture of wax migrates to the surface of the product and forms a protective layer. The layer can also act as a release agent, helping the product separate from its mould.
 Mechanical thermostats and actuators, as an expansion medium for activating such devices
 As a potting material to encapsulate electronic components such as guitar pickups, transformers, and inductors, to prevent moisture ingress and to reduce electromagnetically-induced acoustic noise and microphonic effects
 Textile manufacturing processes, such as that used for Eisengarn thread.
 Thickening agent in many paintballs
 Moisturiser in toiletries and cosmetics such as Vaseline.
 Prevents oxidation on the surface of polished steel and iron
 Phase change material for thermal energy storage
 Used by MESSENGER (Mercury spacecraft), when the spacecraft was unable to radiate excessive heat.
 Manufacture of boiled leather armor and books
 Neutron radiation shielding
 Wax baths for occupational and physical therapies, and cosmetic treatments
 Used for wood finishing 
 Used as a fuel for fire breathing
 Used in Lava Lamps

Occupational safety 
People can be exposed to paraffin in the workplace by breathing it in, skin contact, and eye contact. The National Institute for Occupational Safety and Health (NIOSH) has set a recommended exposure limit (REL) for paraffin wax fume exposure of 2 mg/m3 over an 8-hour workday.

See also 
 Oligomer
 Ozokerite

References

External links 

 "Odd Uses of Paraffin", Scientific American, 13 July 1878, p. 19 

Waxes
Alkanes
Petroleum products
Food additives
E-number additives